High Point Charter School is a Charter school located in Sparta, Wisconsin. Currently there are around fifty students enrolled in High Point.

The school is currently taught by Mark Engeldinger and Shannon Ontiveros.

It is a project based learning school where students lead 80% of their education. It runs from 7th to 12th grade.

Notes

Schools in Monroe County, Wisconsin
Charter schools in Wisconsin
Public high schools in Wisconsin
Public middle schools in Wisconsin